Kostas Mexas (born October 25, 1976) is a Greek professional basketball coach, who is currently an assistant coach for Panathinaikos of the Greek Basket League and the EuroLeague.

Coaching career
After coaching Choriatis from 1997 to 2003, Mexas started working as an assistant coach with the Greek Basket League club Ampelokipoi in 2003. He became the head coach of two women teams from 2004 until 2006. He became the head coach of the Greek club MENT in 2006.

On 2014, after working for 4 years as an assistant at KAOD, he became the head coach of the club, replacing Nenad Marković. The following two years, he coached Apollon Patras, before being sacked from the team on January 7 , 2017. On June 21, 2017, Mexas as appointed as the head coach at Aries Trikala of the Greek Basket League.

References

External links
 Kostas Mexas at kapasports.gr
 Kostas Mexas at eurobasket.com

1976 births
Living people
Apollon Patras B.C. coaches
Aries Trikala B.C. coaches
Greek basketball coaches
Ionikos Nikaias B.C. coaches
Iraklis Thessaloniki B.C. coaches
KAOD B.C. coaches
M.E.N.T. B.C. coaches
P.A.O.K. BC coaches
Panathinaikos B.C. coaches
Sportspeople from Corfu